The 1996 United States presidential election in Maryland took place on November 5, 1996, as part of the 1996 United States presidential election. Voters chose 10 representatives, or electors to the Electoral College, who voted for president and vice president.

Maryland was won by incumbent President Bill Clinton (D-Arkansas) with 54.25% of the popular vote over Senator Bob Dole (R-Kansas) with 38.27%. Businessman Ross Perot (Reform-Texas) finished in third, with 6.50% of the popular vote. Clinton ultimately won the national vote, defeating both challengers and becoming re-elected to a second term as U.S. President. To date this is the last election in which Dorchester County voted for a Democratic presidential candidate. Conversely, this is also the last time Charles County voted for a Republican presidential candidate. As of the 2020 presidential election, this is the last time that Garrett County was not the most Republican county in the state. This also marks the last occasion in which Maryland was not the most Democratic state in the South (as defined by the U.S. Census Bureau).

Results

Results by county

Counties that flipped from Republican to Democratic
Dorchester (Largest city: Cambridge)
Kent (Largest city: Chestertown)
Somerset (Largest city: Princess Anne)

See also
 United States presidential elections in Maryland
 1996 United States presidential election
 1996 United States elections

Notes

References 

Maryland
1996
Presidential